Sha Tin Junior School is a primary school run by the English Schools Foundation in Fo Tan, Sha Tin, New Territories, Hong Kong.

The school opened in 1988, and the founding principal Gordon Lewis remained in this post until his retirement in 2004. He was subsequently awarded an OBE in recognition of his services to education in Hong Kong. After the Retirement of Mr Lewis, the new assigned principal was Dr Allan Weston who later resigned at the end of the 2008–09 school year to take over the CEO position at Taipei European School in Taiwan. Since June 2009 the principal has been Mr Perry Tunesi. Mr Tunesi retired August 2019 and he is replaced by Mrs Rehana Shanks.

The school now has a 5-class entry for each year group with a total of around 900 students. The sports facilities include a swimming pool, a multi-purpose sports hall (with badminton, basketball, volleyball, and climbing facilities), and an Astro-turf pitch, all shared with Sha Tin College.

It provides for children from Year One to Year Six, and each class is named by its year group first followed by another number (from 1 to 5) e.g. Y6.2

Curriculum 
Sha Tin Junior School has recently adopted the Primary Years Programme (PYP) of the International Baccalaureate Organization.

The school teaches general subjects such as: Maths, English, Chinese, Music, PE, ICT and also 'Units of Inquiry': there are six units per year (two per term), each lasting for around 6 weeks, and each one will focus on particular subjects such as Geography, Art, History, Science etc.

Facilities 
There are many facilities, such as a learning centre, arts room, DARC room, mandarin rooms, a gym, a multi-purpose hall, an ICT room, music room anda large roof playground. In the new block built in 2002, there is a  swimming pool, a multipurpose sports hall, a gym, a lift, toilets and changing rooms. The Sports facilities are also shared with Sha Tin College although the building is not physically connected to the Sha Tin College campus. The new block was also recently renovated. The block houses the new library, a new design room (aka. The POD), classrooms for years 1-3, the PAR (performing arts room). There has also been a building works that was completed in 2012.

Houses 
There are four houses, they are, Banyan(Green), Dragon(Red), Lion(Yellow), Sand martin(Blue).

See also
Sha Tin College
English Schools Foundation

External links 

English Schools Foundation schools
Educational institutions established in 1988
Primary schools in Hong Kong
Fo Tan
1988 establishments in Hong Kong